Gerald R. Tuttle (March 6, 1926 – April 25, 2006) was an American football quarterback  who played two seasons in the Canadian Football League with the Toronto Argonauts and BC Lions. He played college football at Kent State University. Tuttle also played for and served as head coach of the Toronto Balmy Beach Beachers of the Ontario Rugby Football Union. He died in 2006.

References

External links
Just Sports Stats
Gerry Tuttle Coaching History
1950 season
Fanbase profile

1926 births
2006 deaths
Sportspeople from Kent, Ohio
American football quarterbacks
Canadian football quarterbacks
American players of Canadian football
Kent State Golden Flashes football players
Toronto Balmy Beach Beachers players
Toronto Argonauts players
BC Lions players
Player-coaches
Players of American football from Ohio